Dauntsey is a village and parish in Wiltshire in the United Kingdom.

Dauntsey or Dauntesey may also refer to:

People 
John Dauntsey (died 1391), English politician
William Dauntesey or Dauntsey, 16th-century London merchant and Master of the Worshipful Company of Mercers

Places in the United Kingdom
Dauntsey Vale, vale in Wiltshire
Dauntsey railway station, former station in Wiltshire
Winterbourne Dauntsey, village in Wiltshire

See also
Daunt
Dauntsey's School